Dioon caputoi is a species of cycad that is native to the state of Puebla, Mexico. It is found near Loma de la Grana, located 6 km southwest of San Luis Atolotitlán (formerly San Luis Tultitlanapa), Caltepec. It is protected by the Tehuacán-Cuicatlán Biosphere Reserve. As of 2018, there are only five or six known populations of Dioon caputoi remaining in the wild. Within each population are between 50 and 120, primarily adult, specimens that are distributed randomly throughout the dry scrubland.

References

External links
 
 

caputoi
Plants described in 1980
Flora of Mexico